The ESC Congress is the annual congress of the European Society of Cardiology (ESC), the largest medical congress in Europe. It gathers over 30,000 active participants (mainly cardiologists) and takes place every year in August/September  in a different European city.


List of ESC Congresses
The first ESC Congress was held in 1950 and from then on every 4 years until 1988, when it became an annual event.
 1984 -  Düsseldorf
 1988 -  Vienna
 1989 -  Nice
 1990 -  Stockholm
 1991 -  Amsterdam
 1992 -  Barcelona
 1993 -  Nice
 1994 -  Berlin
 1995 -  Amsterdam
 1996 -  Birmingham
 1997 -  Stockholm
 1998 -  Vienna
 1999 -  Barcelona
 2000 -  Amsterdam
 2001 -  Stockholm
 2002 -  Berlin
 2003 -  Vienna
 2004 -  Munich
 2005 -  Stockholm
 2006 -  Barcelona
 2007 -  Vienna
 2008 -  Munich
 2009 -  Barcelona
 2010 -  Stockholm
 2011 -  Paris
 2012 -  Munich
 2013 -  Amsterdam
 2014 -  Barcelona
 2015 -  London
 2016 -  Rome
 2017 -  Barcelona
 2018 -  Munich
 2019 -  Paris
 2020 -  Amsterdam
 2021 -  London

After the 2017 ESC Congress, Barcelona  became the city with most congresses since 1988(6), followed by Stockholm  (5) and then by Amsterdam  and Vienna  and Munich  (4 times each as of 2018).
Some congresses (1994 and 2006) were organised jointly with the World Heart Federation under the name of "World Congress of Cardiology".

References

External links
 European Society of Cardiology
 European Society of Cardiology Congress 2014

European medical and health organizations
Cardiology